Bima Stadium is the name of a football stadium in the city of Cirebon, West Java, Indonesia. It was named after Bhima, a figure in the Mahabharata  is used as the home venue for PSIT Cirebon and PS Gunung Jati Cirebon. The stadium has a capacity of 15,000. The stadium was built in 1972.

References

External links
 Stadium information 

Football venues in Indonesia
Buildings and structures in Cirebon
Sport in West Java